Brascia is an Italian surname. Notable people with the surname include:

Christina Brascia, American actress 
John Brascia (1932–2013), American actor and dancer

Italian-language surnames